Armoor is a town in Nizamabad district in the state of Telangana in India. Armoor is situated on NH 7 and NH 63. In earlier days, it was called Navanathapuram since it has nine mountains around the town Armoor (9 mountains) is a variation of it.Armoor is one of fastest growing city in the Telangana state

Demographics 
Armoor is one of the fastest growing towns in Telangana state.
Armoor Municipality merged two villages (Mamidipalli And Perkit). It around occupies  with 36 election wards and a population of 67,271 (2011 Census). 

The population of children with age of 0-6 is 7094 which is 11.08%. Female sex ratio is of 1017 against the state average of 993. Child Sex Ratio in Armur is around 946 compared to Andhra Pradesh state average of 939. The literacy rate of Armur city is 74% higher than the state average of 67%. In Armur, male literacy is around 83% while the female literacy rate is 66%.

Geography 
Coordinates-18°48′N 78°17′E Coordinates: 18°48′N 78°17′E

Armoor is the Second largest town in the Nizamabad district.

Government and politics 
Armoor was constituted in 2006 and is classified as a third grade municipality.

Transport 
Armoor is well connected by National Highway roads NH-44(7) (Asia highway 43 AH-43) and NH-16. Armoor railway station (ARMR) is situated on Peddapalli-Nizamabad section. The nearest airport is Hyderabad International Airport which is 200 KM. The Bus facility to State Capital Hyderabad is available every 30 minutes.

Education 
Armoor is one of the major educational centers in Nizamabad District. The town is the home to Kshatriya College of Engineering, and 5+ Degree colleges and 7+ intermediate colleges.  Many students from neighboring districts of Nirmal, Jagityal, Kamareddy, and Karimnagar take up admissions here for their higher education. Also, 2 Model schools were established in the year 2014 by the central government in EBBs, to uplift the education system & provide free education in English medium.

Tourism
Sri Navanatha Siddeshwara temple is located in Armoor town about 27 K.m. Northeast at Nizamabad district. There is beautiful rock formation around this temple which extends up to 2 km. legend says that on this hillock and hence it is called as Navanathapura. There are many temples on the hillock namely Shivalayam, Ramalayam, Hanuman Temple, Durga Devi Temple, and all these temples are believed to be Swayambhu Temples. And also recently inaugurated for Sahasrarjun statue on siddulagutta. Inside these caves is a Shiva Temple, where the Shiva Lingam is said to be swaymbhu or self-manifested. The entrance to this cave temple is a door that is barely three feet. Just outside the exit point of this narrow cave is a Ramalayam and the temple tank, Jeeva Koneru. Fifteen years ago a ghat road was built through the rock formation, leading straight to Siddulagutta. There is also a walkway from the Gol Bungalow for pilgrims wishing to do the climb up to the temple by foot.

Health and hospitality
Armoor is becoming one of the major Healthcare centers in the Nizamabad District. The town is with almost 50+ hospitals including surgeons, orthopedics, gynecologist, dental specialists, ENT, Eye specialists, RMP's and PMP's

Notable Persons 

 G. S. Varadachary: Senior Telugu language film critic and journalist.

References 

Armur Population Census 2011

 Cities and towns in Nizamabad district